"I'm Just a Girl Who Can't Say D'oh" is the twentieth episode of the thirtieth season of the American animated television series The Simpsons, and the 659th episode overall. It aired in the United States on Fox on April 7, 2019.

Plot
A disgruntled cast and crew expel short-tempered perfectionist theater director Llewellyn Sinclair from their production of Oklahoma!. Marge steps up to helm a different show production written by Lisa about Springfield's founder Jebediah Springfield. Her show is a parody of Hamilton: An American Musical, a sung-and-rapped through musical about the life of American Founding Father Alexander Hamilton.

Krusty plans to air Lisa's musical, Bloody, Bloody Jebediah with Sideshow Mel in the title role, on live TV, recording the open-air production.  Its title is a reference to the musical Bloody Bloody Andrew Jackson.  However, Mel later drops out of the show so Marge recasts the part, finding Professor Frink (Josh Groban) has a stunning singing voice. However it is revealed that rain is forecast for the live performance. Bloody, Bloody Jebediah airs live and starts off successfully, however during a commercial break it starts pouring rain. Jebediah's bear (John Lithgow) starts to sink into a puddle so Lisa quickly rewrites the ending to the satisfaction of the audience. The production is nominated for twelve awards, with Marge winning a special award for best newcomer.

Meanwhile, Homer notices a popular baby class taking place and joins with Maggie. His confusion about the popularity is answered when he sees Chloe, the sexy supervisor running the "Daddy and Me" baby class. It all ends when another father named Barry divorces, allowing him to marry Chloe all to himself.

Production
This episode was scheduled to air on April 28, 2019, but was moved to April 7, 2019 since The Incredible Lightness of Being a Baby was delayed to the next season after the show's producers decided to make a short film related to the episode titled Playdate with Destiny as well.

The closing credits for the episode uses a clip from the music video "White Wine Spritzer" by Okilly Dokilly.

Reception
Dennis Perkins from The A.V. Club gave the episode a C− stating, "Unfortunately, the resulting episode, 'I'm Just A Girl Who Can’t Say D'oh' is a listless, carelessly plotted outing, where character and narrative logic give way to plodding storytelling, a serious lack of jokes, and one of the least interesting (and yet vaguely irritating) B-plots in recent memory."

"I'm Just a Girl Who Can't Say D'oh" scored a 0.7 rating with a 3 share and was watched by 1.61 million people.

References

External links 
 

2019 American television episodes
The Simpsons (season 30) episodes